Zacatrophon is a genus of sea snails, marine gastropod mollusks in the family Muricidae, the murex snails or rock snails.

Species
Species within the genus Zacatrophon include:

 Zacatrophon beebei (Hertlein & Strong, 1948)

References

Ocenebrinae
Monotypic gastropod genera